Joan-Enric Vives i Sicília (born 24 July 1949) is a Spanish cleric, who has served as Bishop of Urgell since 2003, and is therefore the Co-Prince of Andorra. This makes him a joint-head-of-state (alongside the President of France) and one of the two Catholic religious figures in the world who also leads a country, the other such prelate being the Pope himself (who leads Vatican City). 

He holds the rank of archbishop as a personal distinction, his diocese being a suffragan diocese.

Life 

Vives i Sicília was born in 1949 in Barcelona as the third son of Francesc Vives i Pons and of Cornèlia Sicília Ibáñez, who were small retailers. He entered the seminary in 1965 and studied humanities, philosophy and theology. In 1974, Vives was ordained a priest in his native parish Santa Maria del Taulat de Barcelona. He was later nominated as auxiliary bishop of Barcelona (and titular bishop of Nona) in 1993, and consecrated to the episcopacy and automatically became a member of the Spanish Episcopal Conference. Pope John Paul II nominated him as coadjutor bishop of Urgell in 2001.  After two years, on the retirement of his predecessor Joan Martí Alanis in 2003, he succeeded him as Bishop of Urgell on 12 May 2003, and hence therefore as co-prince of Andorra in the Principality of Andorra located in the heights of the Pyrenees Mountains. On 10 July 2003, he carried out the Constitutional Oath as the new Co-Prince of Andorra at "Casa de la Vall", Andorra la Vella. Vives i Sicília was later elevated to archbishop as a personal title by Pope Benedict XVI in March 2010.

Foreign honours 
 Grand Cross of the Order of Christ of the Portuguese Republic (5 March 2010).

References

External links 
 
 

1949 births
21st-century Roman Catholic archbishops in Spain
20th-century Roman Catholic bishops in Spain
21st-century Princes of Andorra
Bishops of Urgell
Living people
Clergy from Barcelona
Grand Crosses of the Order of Christ (Portugal)
Bishops appointed by Pope John Paul II